Guy Andrews, educated at Cranleigh School (1974–79) and St. Peter's College, Oxford University, is an English television writer who has written for television programmes including "Lost in Austen", "Absolute Power", "Agatha Christie's Poirot", "Chancer" and "Blandings" (the latter adapting the works of P. G. Wodehouse).

Writing credits

References

External links 
   

British television writers
People educated at Cranleigh School
Living people
Place of birth missing (living people)
Year of birth missing (living people)
Alumni of St Peter's College, Oxford